Qatar-e Olya (also Romanized as Qaţār-e ‘Olyā; also known as Qaţār Qayah) is a village in Angut-e Sharqi Rural District, Anguti District, Germi County, Ardabil Province, Iran. At the 2006 census, its population was 145, in 28 families.

References 

Towns and villages in Germi County